Storholmen Lighthouse is an active lighthouse in the municipality of Giske in Møre og Romsdal county on the west coast of Norway. The light is lit from 16 July until 21 May. It is not lit during the summer because it is unnecessary due to the midnight sun in this part of the world.

The lighthouse was only accessible by boat in calm seas during the summer, since boats cannot land on the tiny island. Goods and people had to be hoisted onto the island from the sea. From 1970 and until the lighthouse was automated in 1980, transport to the lighthouse was done by helicopter. The narrow  landing pad could only be used by very experienced pilots.

See also

 List of lighthouses in Norway
 Lighthouses in Norway

References

External links
 Norsk Fyrhistorisk Forening 
 Picture of Storholmen Lighthouse Panoramio

Lighthouses completed in 1920
Lighthouses in Møre og Romsdal
Giske
1920 establishments in Norway